Iván Alberto Flores García (born 15 June 1955) is a Chilean politician currently serving as a member of the Chamber of Deputies, representing District 24 of the Los Ríos Region. He served as President of the Chamber of Deputies from March 2019 to April 2020.

Flores served as intendant of the Los Ríos Region from its creation in 2007 until his resignation in 2009. Flores resigned after being heavily criticized at a national level by the opposition after he was photographed with propaganda of Eduardo Frei's presidential campaign while he was on official duties.

Iván Flores had previously served as provincial governor of Valdivia from 1998 to 2000.

References

People from Valdivia
Austral University of Chile alumni
Chilean veterinarians
Living people
Presidents of the Chamber of Deputies of Chile
Members of the Chamber of Deputies of Chile
1955 births
Christian Democratic Party (Chile) politicians
Senators of the LV Legislative Period of the National Congress of Chile
Senators of the LVI Legislative Period of the National Congress of Chile